The 1959 Houston Cougars football team was an American football team that represented the University of Houston in the Missouri Valley Conference (MVC) during the 1959 NCAA University Division football season. In its third season under head coach Hal Lahar, the team compiled a 3–7 record (3–1 against conference opponents) and tied with North Texas State for the MVC championship. Claude King and Howard Evans were the team captains. The team played its home games at Rice Stadium in Houston.

Schedule

References

Houston
Houston Cougars football seasons
Missouri Valley Conference football champion seasons
Houston Cougars football